Diarra is a given name and surname. Diarra may also refer to:

Diarra, Burkina Faso, village in the Béguédo Department of Boulgou Province, south-eastern Burkina Faso
Diarra, Mali, small town and commune in Mali

See also
Diara railway station, Kolkata Suburban Railway Station, India
Diarra-Betongo, village in the Zonsé Department of Boulgou Province, south-eastern Burkina Faso